Hyogo 11th district (兵庫県第11区 Hyōgo-ken dai-jūikku or simply 兵庫11区 Hyōgo 11-ku) is a constituency of the House of Representatives in the Diet of Japan. It is located in Southwestern Hyōgo and is based on the 1995 borders of the city of Himeji; the former towns of Ieshima, Yumesaki, Kōdera and Yasutomi that merged into Himeji in 2006 are part of the 12th district. As of September 2015, 387,509 eligible voters were registered in the district.

Before the electoral reform of 1994, the area formed part of Hyōgo 4th district where four Representatives had been elected by single non-transferable vote.

Since the district's creation, it has been represented by two people: Tōru Toida of the Liberal Democratic Party, the son of former representative and health minister Saburō Toida, and Takeaki Matsumoto, formerly of the Democratic Party of Japan, son of former representative and defense minister Jūrō Matsumoto and great-great-grandson of former prime minister Hirobumi Itō.

List of representatives

Election results

2014 general election
The 47th election for the House of Representatives held in December 2014 saw Takeaki Matsumoto retain the district for the Democratic Party by once again defeating the LDP candidate Nobuhide Zushi. It was Matsumoto's third consecutive win and he is currently serving his fifth term as the district's representative and his sixth consecutive term in the House of Representatives. Zushi was officially endorsed by Komeito, the LDP's junior coalition partner.

2012 general election
The 46th election for the House of Representatives saw Takeaki Matsumoto retain the district by defeating the LDP's candidate, newcomer Nobuhide Zushi. Matsumoto was one of a minority of DPJ members to retain his seat as the party was swept from power, losing 174 of its 231 seats in a landslide victory to the LDP led by former Prime Minister Shinzo Abe. Matsumoto was officially endorsed by the DPJ's coalition partner, the People's New Party, while Zushi was endorsed by Komeito. This election saw the rise of the Japan Restoration Party, which won 54 seats in the election. The party's candidate in Hyogo 11th, company director Sōichirō Katada, was endorsed by Your Party.

Earlier elections

See also
Hyogo at-large district - the multi-member district representing Hyogo Prefecture in the House of Councillors

References 

Districts of the House of Representatives (Japan)